Events in the year 2023 in Denmark.

Incumbents 
 Monarch – Margrethe II
 Prime Minister – Mette Frederiksen
 Government: Frederiksen II Cabinet
 Folketing: 2022–2026 session (elected 1 November 2022)
 Leaders of the constituent countries
 Prime minister of the Faroe Islands – Aksel V. Johannesen
 Prime minister of Greenland – Múte Bourup Egede

Events

January 
 1 January  Prince Joachim's four children, Nikolai, Felix, Henrik, and Athena, lose their titles of prince or princess, leaving count or countess of Monpezat as their most senior titles following a major public controversy in the royal family.
 10 January  Leader of the Nye Borgerlige political party Pernille Vermund announces her intention to resign followed by fragmentation in the party with MF Mikkel Bjørn Sørensen leaving to join the DF and Lars Boje Mathiesen taking office as new leader on 7 February.
 31 January  Coop Danmark announces that the Irma chain will close with effect from 1 April after 137 years in operation.

February 

 6 February  Minister of Defence and Deputy Prime Minister Jakob Ellemann-Jensen goes on sick leave indefinitely with incumbent Minister for Economic Affairs Troels Lund Poulsen being appointed acting Minister of Defence.

 11 February  The 53rd edition of Dansk Melodi Grand Prix 2023 is held in Arena Næstved in Næstved with Faroese singer Reiley being selected as Denmark's entry for the Eurovision Song Contest
 17 February  A major storm named Otto (da) hits most of Denmark causing several incidents of property damage.
 28 February  Great Prayer Day (Store Bededag= is abolished with effect from 2024.

March 

 6 March  Denmark's Ministry of Defence ban TikTok on work devices.

Sports
Badminton
 15 January  Viktor Axelsen wins gold in men's single at 2023 Malaysia Open.

Cycling
 26 February  Jonas Vingegaard wins the 2023 O Gran Camiño.

Football

 1623 February  FC Midtjylland is defeated 51 on aggregate by Sporting CP in the knockout phase of the 2022–23 UEFA Europa League.
 17 February  The 2022–23 Danish Superliga returns after an unusually long winter break.

Handball
 29 January  Denmark wins the 2023 World Men's Handball Championship for the third time in a row by defeating France 3429 in the final.
18  GOG wins the Danish Men's Handball Cup for the second year in a row by defeating Skjern 34 – 29 in the final.

Golf
 19 February  Thorbjørn Olesen wins Thailand Classic.

Tennis
 18 February  Clara Tauson wons AK Ladies Open in Altenkirchen by defeating  Greet Minnen with 7-6 (7-5), 4-6, 6-2 in the final.

Scheduled 
 9–13 May  Eurovision Song Contest
 24 June  Roskilde Festival
 3 October  The opening of the Folketing (da) will take place, marking the beginning of a new legislative session.
 21 August  The 2023 BWF World Championships will takes place in Copenhagen.

 2022–23 Denmark Series
 2022–23 Danish Cup
 2022–23 Danish Superliga

Deaths

January 
 1 January   Lise Nørgaard, writer, journalist, and creator of Matador (born 1917)
 21 January  Ritt Bjerregaard, former politician, minister of education, and lord mayor of Copenhagen (born 1941)
 31 January  Henrik Nordbrandt, poet (born 1945)

February 
 3 February  Michael Juul Sørensen (da), radio host (born 1949)
 6 February
 Inge Krogh, politician (born 1920)
 Greta Andersen, swimmer (born 1927)
 24 February  Lars-Viggo Jensen (born 1945)
 28 Febriary  Jens Kristian Hansen, politician (born 1926)

March
8 March – Josua Madsen, rock drummer, 45 (traffic accident)

References 

 
Denmark
Denmark
2020s in Denmark
Years of the 21st century in Denmark